Mademoiselle de Chartres may refer to one of the following:

Marie Anne d'Orléans (1652–1656) daughter of Gaston, Duke of Orléans and Marguerite de Lorraine
Élisabeth Charlotte d'Orléans (1676–1744) daughter of Philippe I, Duke of Orléans and Elizabeth Charlotte of the Palatinate
Louise Adélaïde d'Orléans (1698–1743) second daughter of Philippe II, Duke of Orléans and Françoise-Marie de Bourbon
Louise Diane d'Orléans (1716–1736) youngest daughter of Philippe II, Duke of Orléans and Françoise-Marie de Bourbon
Françoise d'Orléans (1777–1782) daughter of Louis Philippe II, Duke of Orléans and Louise Marie Adélaïde de Bourbon